The Central Mainland of the Shetland Islands is the part of the Mainland, the largest of the Shetland Islands, Scotland. It is located between Hellister, Aith and Voe.

References

Geography of Shetland
Mainland, Shetland